The 1943 Utah Redskins football team was an American football team that represented the University of Utah as a member of the Mountain States Conference (MSC) during the 1943 college football season. In their 19th season under head coach Ike Armstrong, the Redskins compiled an overall record of 0–7 with a mark of 0–2 against conference opponents.

Utah considered cancelling football in 1943 due to World War II. College enrollment dropped significantly as many college-aged men enlisted in the armed services. LeRoy E. Cowles, President of the University of Utah, asked that the team continue to play. Armstrong supported Cowles despite having a severe shortage of players. Among MSC members, only Colorado, Denver, and Utah fielder a football team in 1943. To play a semblance of a full schedule, Utah played Colorado twice and resorted to playing enlisted men from Fort Warren, Wyoming. Utah has its first winless season since going 0–1 in 1895.

Schedule

After the season

NFL Draft
Utah had two players selected in the 1944 NFL Draft.

References

Utah
Utah Utes football seasons
College football winless seasons
Utah Redskins football